The Philippine College of Criminology (PCCR) is a private, non-sectarian, coeducational secondary and higher education institution located in Quiapo, Manila, Philippines. It is currently led by Ma. Angelica Lei Bautista as president.

History
Former Supreme Court Justice Felix Angelo Bautista founded the Philippine College of Criminology in 1954.  It is the pioneer school of criminology for scientific crime detection and police science education in the Philippines.

The school currently offers doctorate, master and bachelor's degrees in criminology, and high school diploma. It also conducts review classes for Licensure Examinations in Criminology.

Notable alumni
 Robin Padilla, Senator of the Philippines, actor
 Yul Servo, Vice Mayor of Manila and actor 
 Rolando Mendoza, perpetrator of the Manila hostage crisis.

References

External links
 official website

Education in Quiapo, Manila
Universities and colleges in Manila